Harvey King Blauvelt (December 1867 – May 25, 1929) was a 19th-century Major League Baseball pitcher. He played in two games for the 1890 Rochester Broncos of the American Association.

Blauvelt's two appearances came in June 1890, and both were as a relief pitcher. The first was against the Brooklyn Gladiators, and the second was against the St. Louis Browns.

References

External links

Retrosheet

1867 births
1929 deaths
19th-century baseball players
Major League Baseball pitchers
Rochester Broncos players
San Francisco Friscos players
San Francisco Metropolitans players
Rochester Hop Bitters players
Rochester Flour Cities players
Elmira Pioneers players
People from Trumansburg, New York
Baseball players from New York City